Christopher Clare Showerman (born June 24, 1971) is an American actor, best known for his role as George in George of the Jungle 2 (2003).

Early life
Showerman was born in Jackson, Michigan on June 24, 1971. He was raised in Stockbridge, Michigan and attended Stockbridge High School.

He embarked on an acting career after attending Michigan State University, where he majored in music. After small roles in several studio feature films, including Starship Troopers (1997) and Best in Show (2000), Showerman was cast in the lead in Dumped (2000). His big break came in 2003 when he was cast to replace Brendan Fraser as George in George of the Jungle 2 (2003).

Career
Showerman has appeared in such films as Sea of Fear, Idol, Live Fast, Die Young, Complacent, and Big Game. His film credits include Hole in One, A Night at the Silent Movie Theater, Commander and Chief, and Radio America, which he also wrote, produced and directed. On television, he has appeared on Jack of All Trades, The OC, and CSI Miami.

A year after Brendan Fraser opted not to reprise his role as George in Disney's George of the Jungle 2 sequel, Disney decided to produce the film for the direct-to-video market. Showerman was asked to play the part of George.

Producing
In 2006, Showerman formed an independent film production company called Shorris Film with Clint Morris, whose first film was the supernatural western Between the Sand and the Sky. The company also produced Radio America, co-starring, directed and written by Showerman. In 2012, Shorris Film co-produced Bristled: The Howl Chronicles.

Filmography

References

External links
 
 Scifiscoop.com Interview for "The Land that Time Forgot"
 Interview for "The Land That Time Forgot"
 Actors Life

1971 births
Living people
Film producers from Michigan
Michigan State University alumni
American male television actors
American male film actors
American people of Dutch descent
People from Jackson, Michigan
Male actors from Michigan